Werner Meyer may refer to:
Werner Meyer (handballer) (1914–1985), Swiss field handball player
Werner Meyer, a mathematician who introduced the Meyer signature cocycle